Byron is an unincorporated community in Howard Township, Parke County, in the U.S. state of Indiana.

History
A post office was established at Byron in 1884, and remained in operation until 1905. The community probably bears the name of Lord Byron.

Geography

References

Unincorporated communities in Indiana
Unincorporated communities in Parke County, Indiana